Vincenzo Santucci, also Vincenso Santucci (18 February 1796 - 19 August 1861) was an Italian cardinal, who spent his life serving in the Roman Curia.

Life
He was born the son of Ascenso Santucci and Clorinda Mazzetti in Gorga in the region of Lazio, then part of the Papal States, now in the Province of Rome.

As a young man, Santucci completed his higher education at the Pamphilio College, after which he was ordained as a Catholic priest at an unknown date. In 1832 he began a career in the papal diplomatic corps, serving as secretary to Cardinal Placido Zurla, O.S.B. Cam., in the Vatican Secretariat of State.

Santucci was named a Cardinal Deacon by Pope Pius IX in the consistory of 7 March 1853 and was given as his titular church that of Santi Vito, Modesto e Crescenzio from 1853 to 1854, when he was granted a change to holding the Basilica of Santa Maria ad Martyres, better known as the Pantheon. In November 1856 he was named the Prefect of the Sacred Congregation of Studies, now the Congregation for Catholic Education, a post which he held until his death.

Santucci died in Rome at the age of 65 and, at his request, was buried in the Archbasilica of St. John Lateran.

References

1796 births
1861 deaths
People from the Metropolitan City of Rome Capital
19th-century Italian cardinals
Cardinals created by Pope Pius IX
Burials at the Archbasilica of Saint John Lateran